The following is a list of LTV A-7 Corsair II on static display or in museums

Greece 
A-7H
 158825 - Hellenic Air Force Museum Tatoi
 159664 - Hellenic Air Force Museum Tatoi
 160616 - Hellenic Air Force Museum Tatoi

Poland 
A-7P 
 5502 - Ex Portuguese Air Force, Polish Aviation Museum Cracow

Thailand 

A-7E 
 160563 - Retired Royal Thai Navy in the Royal Thai Air Force Museum

United States 

A-7A
 152647 - High Springs Community School, High Springs, Florida.
 152650 - Don Garlits Museum of Drag Racing, Ocala, Florida.
 152658 - Patuxent River Naval Air Museum, Patuxent River, Maryland.
 152660 (displayed as 69-6234) - Flying Tiger Heritage Park, England AFB (formerly), Alexandria, Louisiana.
 152668 - Museum of Science and Industry, Chicago, Illinois.
 152681 - Prairie Aviation Museum, Bloomington, Illinois.
 153135 - Valiant Air Command Warbird Museum, Titusville, Florida.
 153142 - Alliance High School, Alliance, Ohio.
 153150 - Cecil Field POW/MIA Memorial, formerly Pocahontas Municipal Airport (moved August 2019), Pocahontas, Arkansas.
 153163 - Fabricor Inc., Cleves, Ohio.
 153220 - American Legion Post 1170, Round Lake, Illinois.
 153241 - Pacific Coast Air Museum, Santa Rosa, California.
 153242 - U.S. Space and Rocket Center, Huntsville, Alabama.
 153266 - Veterans of Foreign Wars (VFW) Post 8343 & 11038, Rochester, Wisconsin.
 154345 - Hickory Aviation Museum, Hickory, North Carolina.

A-7B

 154362 - NAS Alameda (formerly), Alameda, California.
 154370 - USS Midway Museum, San Diego, California.
 154420 - NAS Fallon, Nevada.
 154431 - Texas Air Museum - Caprock Chapter, Slaton Municipal Airport, Slaton, Texas.
 154443 - NAS Lakehurst, Lakehurst, New Jersey.
 154449 - Joe Davies Heritage Airpark at Palmdale Plant 42, Palmdale, California.
 154474 - NASA Stennis Space Center, Bay Saint Louis, Mississippi.
 154475 - Yanks Air Museum, Chino, California.
 154476 - El Centro NAF, El Centro, California.
 154479 - Fort Worth Aviation Museum, Fort Worth, Texas.
 154485 - American Military Heritage Foundation Museum, Saint John the Baptist Peri Airport, Reserve, Louisiana.
 154502 - Frontiers of Flight Museum, Dallas, Texas.
 154505 - Celebrity Row, Davis-Monthan AFB (North Side), Tucson, Arizona.

 154523 - Arkansas Air & Military Museum, Fayetteville, Arkansas.
 154538 - Yanks Air Museum, Chino, California.
 154548 - USS Lexington Museum, Corpus Christi, Texas.
 154550 - Air Victory Museum, Medford, New Jersey.
 154554 - San Diego Air and Space Museum, Gillespie Field Annex, San Diego, California.

A-7C

 156734 - NAS Fallon, Fallon, Nevada.
 156739 - Estrella Warbirds Museum, Paso Robles, California.
 156763 (displayed as 160122) - NAS Lemoore, California.
 156797 - United States Naval Museum of Armament and Technology, Ridgecrest, California.

TA-7C

 154407 - National Museum of Nuclear Science and History, Albuquerque, New Mexico.
 156751 - Russell Military Museum, Russell, Illinois.
 156782 - New Century Air Center, Olathe, Kansas.

YA-7D
 67-14583 - Air Force Flight Test Center Museum, Edwards AFB, California.

A-7D
 68-8220 - Tomah Veterans Hospital, Wisconsin.
 68-8222 - Dakota Territory Air Museum, Minot International Airport, Minot, North Dakota.
 68-8223 - Veterans of Foreign Wars (VFW) Post 728, Danville, Illinois.
 68-8226 - American Veterans (AMVETS) Post 7, North Vernon, Indiana.
 68-8229 - Warrior Park, Davis-Monthan AFB (North Side), Tucson, Arizona.
 68-8230 - Cullom, Illinois.
 69-6188 - March Field Air Museum, Riverside, California.
 69-6191 - Freedom Park Naval Museum, Omaha, Nebraska.
 69-6192 - Alexander Airport Park, Wausau, Wisconsin.
 69-6193 - Colorado State Veterans Center, Homelake, Colorado.
 69-6197 - Glenn L. Martin Aviation Museum, Middle River, Maryland.
 69-6200 - Wings of Eagles Discovery Center, Horseheads, New York.
 69-6202 - Luis Muñoz Marín International Airport, San Juan, Puerto Rico.
 69-6208 - Veterans of Foreign Wars (VFW) Post 4324, Harry Stern Airport, Wahpeton, North Dakota.
 69-6239 - Faulkton Municipal Airport, Faulkton, South Dakota.
 69-6241 - Brooke County Veterans Memorial Park, Weirton, West Virginia.
 69-6242 - Greeley Weld County Airport, Greeley, Colorado.
 70-0931 - South Dakota ANGB - 114th FW, Sioux Falls, South Dakota.
 70-0937 - Correctionville, Iowa.
 70-0963 - American Legion Post 307, Martin Field, South Sioux City, Nebraska.
 70-0964 - Chico Air Museum, Chico, California. Painted as an A-7E (Buno 157505) from VA-25. This aircraft donated from the collection of George Ford and was purchased at Auction from the Merle Maine Estate Ontario Oregon.
 70-0966 - Virginia Aviation Museum, Richmond International Airport, Richmond, Virginia.
 70-0970 - National Museum of the United States Air Force, Wright-Patterson AFB, Dayton, Ohio.
 70-0973 - Pima Air & Space Museum, Tucson, Arizona.
 70-0982 - Wisconsin National Guard Memorial Library and Museum, Volk Field, Camp Douglas, Wisconsin.
 70-0996 - South Dakota National Guard Museum, Pierre, South Dakota.
 70-0998 - Aerospace Museum of California, McClellan AFB, McClellan, California.
 70-1001 - Buckley Space Force Base (North-West Side), Denver, Colorado.
 70-1008 - Monoma County Veterans Memorial & Museum, Onawa, Iowa.
 70-1012 - Huron Regional Airport, Huron, South Dakota.
 70-1019 - Myrtle Beach AFB, South Carolina.
 70-1028 - Oklahoma ANGB - 138th FG, Tulsa, Oklahoma.
 70-1035 - Memorial Park, McEntire ANGB, Columbia, South Carolina.
 70-1040 - Firefighting Training Center, Helena, Montana.
 70-1046 - Wyoming ANGB - 153th AG, Cheyenne, Wyoming.
 70-1050 - Marv Skie–Lincoln County Airport, Tea, South Dakota.
 70-1055 - Montrose County Airport, Montrose, Colorado.
 71-0334 - Sam Wise Youth Complex, Altoona, Iowa.
 71-0337 - 37th Training Wing HQ Parade Ground, Kelly Field (formerly Kelly AFB), San Antonio, Texas.
 71-0342 - Miracle of America Museum, Polson, Montana.
 71-0347 - American Legion Post 50, Blue Island, Illinois.
 71-0360 - Ohio ANG, Blue Ash Air Station, Blue Ash, Ohio.
 72-0117 - Kirtland AFB, Albuquerque, New Mexico.

 72-0175 - Heritage Museum, Tinker AFB (north side), Oklahoma City, Oklahoma.
 72-0178 - Ohio ANG, Springfield, Ohio.
 72-0188 - Commemorative Air Force - Highland Lakes Squadron, Burnet, Texas.
 72-0211 - Ohio ANG, Toledo Express Airport, Toledo, Ohio.
 72-0213 - Iowa Aviation Museum, Greenfield, Iowa.
 72-0230 - Moody Heritage Park, Moody AFB, Valdosta, Georgia.
 72-0245 - New Mexico ANG, Santa Rosa Route 66 Airport, Santa Rosa, New Mexico.
 72-0247 - Naval Air Reserve Facility, Rickenbacker Airport, Columbus, Ohio.
 72-0254 - Arthur N Neu Airport, Carroll, Iowa.
 72-0261 - Selfridge Military Air Museum and Air Park, Selfridge AFB, Michigan.
 73-0996 - Wings Over the Rockies Air and Space Museum, Denver, Colorado.
 73-0999 - Rickenbacker ANGB, Ohio ANG - 121st ARW, Rickenbacker Airport, Columbus, Ohio.
 73-1002 - Pennsylvania ANGB - 171st ARW, Pittsburgh, Pennsylvania.
 73-1006 - MOTTS Military Museum, Columbus, Ohio.
 73-1009 - Mid-America Air Museum, Liberal, Kansas.
 73-1010 - Veterans Memorial Park, Alexander City, Alabama.
 74-1739 - South Dakota Air and Space Museum, Ellsworth AFB, South Dakota.
 74-1741 - Arizona Military Museum, Phoenix, Arizona.
 74-1746 - National Guard Armory, Farmington, New Mexico.
 74-1756 - 45th Infantry Museum, Oklahoma City, Oklahoma.
 74-1760 - Airport, Salinas, Puerto Rico.
 75-0394 - Arizona ANGB, Tucson, Arizona.
 75-0400 - Grimes ANG - Iowa ANG - 132nd FW, Des Moines Airport, Iowa.
 75-0403 - Iowa Gold Star Military Museum, Camp Dodge, Johnston, Iowa.
 75-0406 - Iowa Air National Guard - 185th Fighter Wing, Sioux City, Iowa.
 75-0408 - Quonset Air Museum, North Kingstown, Rhode Island.

GA-7D
 69-6190 - Russell Military Museum, Zion, Illinois.  Formerly on display at Octave Chanute Aerospace Museum, Rantoul, Illinois.

A-7E

 156801 - under restoration to airworthiness by a private owner in Richardson, Texas.
 156804 - stored outside at the National Naval Aviation Museum, NAS Pensacola, Florida.
 157435 - Watertown Regional Airport, Watertown, South Dakota.
 157452 - Aviation Wing of the Marietta Museum of History, Dobbins ARB (formerly Atlanta NAS), Atlanta, Georgia.
 157455 - War Eagles Air Museum, Santa Teresa, New Mexico.
 157506 - Air Power Park, Hampton, Virginia.
 157586 (displayed as 157503) - Camp Blanding AAF/NG - Museum and Memorial Park, Camp Blanding, Jacksonville, Florida.
 158003 - Brothers Welcome Airport, Lake City, Florida.
 158026 - Heritage in Flight Museum, Lincoln, Illinois.
 158657 (displayed as 158857) - New Century Air Center, Olathe, Kansas.
 158662 - NAS Oceana (South Side), Virginia Beach, Virginia.
 158319 - Tillamook Air Museum, Tillamook, Oregon.
 158842 - Air Classics Museum, Sugar Grove, Illinois.
 159261 - Veterans Memorial Park, University Mall, Tuscaloosa, Alabama.
 159268 - MAPS Air Museum, Canton, Ohio.
 159278 - Southern Museum of Flight, Birmingham, Alabama.
 159291 - Patriots Point Naval & Maritime Museum, Charleston, South Carolina.
 159301 - Oakland Aviation Museum, Oakland, California.
 159303 - Edwardsville Township Park, Edwardsville, Illinois.
 159647 - Fallon Auto Mall, Fallon, Nevada.
 159971 - Carolinas Aviation Museum, Charlotte, North Carolina.
 159974 - New Orleans NAS JRB, New Orleans, Louisiana.
 160613 - Empire State Aerosciences Museum, Glenville, New York.
 160614 - Mountain Home High School, Mountain Home, Arkansas.
 160713 - Pima Air & Space Museum, Tucson, Arizona.
 160714 - National Naval Aviation Museum, NAS Pensacola, Florida.
 160715 - Heritage Park, NAS Jacksonville, Jacksonville, Florida.
 160724 - Louisiana Veterans Memorial, Baton Rouge, Louisiana.
 160869 - Veterans Museum, Halls, Tennessee.

YA-7F
 70-1039 - Hill Aerospace Museum, Hill AFB, Utah.
 71-0344 - Air Force Flight Test Center Museum, Edwards AFB, California.

A-7K
 80-0288 - Celebrity Row, Davis-Monthan AFB (North Side), Tucson, Arizona.
 81-0073 - Iowa Gold Star Military Museum, Camp Dodge, Johnston, Iowa.

Notes

LTV A-7 Corsair IIs